Over recorded history, there have been many names of the Levant, a large area in the Middle East, or its constituent parts. These names have applied to a part or the whole of the Levant. On occasion, two or more of these names have been used at the same time by different cultures or sects. As a natural result, some of the names of the Levant are highly politically charged. Perhaps the least politicized name is Levant itself, which simply means "where the sun rises" or "where the land rises out of the sea", a meaning attributed to the region's easterly location on the shore of the Mediterranean Sea.

Antiquity

Retjenu 
Ancient Egyptian texts (c. 14th century BC) called the entire coastal area along the Mediterranean Sea between modern Egypt and Turkey rṯnw (conventionally Reṯenu). In the Amarna letters, written in Akkadian cuneiform, Reṯenu is subdivided into five regions:

 kꜣnꜥnꜥ (Kanana) or Canaan proper (Idumea, Judea, Samaria);
pꜣ-kꜣnꜥnꜥ (pa-Kanana), city of Gaza; name used in reference to being the administrative centre of Canaan.
 Ḏahy (ḏꜣhy;Ṯahi, Ḏahi), roughly Galilee and coastal plain to Ashkelon dominated by Hazor;
 Rmnn, coast of Lebanon;
 Amurru, (the Amurru kingdom of the Amorites); 
 Kharu (ḥꜣrw), the chief city of which was Ugarit.

Canaan 
 Akkadian: 𒆳𒆠𒈾𒄴𒈾 (Kinaḫnu)
  
 Phoenician: 𐤊𐤍𐤏𐤍 (Knʿn)
  or Χνᾶ (Khanaán or Khna)
 Hebrew
 Israeli  
 Tiberian  
  (Kænaan)
 
 

Prior to (and for some time after) the formation of the Israelite/Hebrew identity and polities in the region, the land was referred to natively as Canaan (first attested in Assyrian Akkadian as Kinaḫnu). Though it was once thought that the Hebrews were foreign settlers in Canaan, the modern consensus of most scholars is that Hebrew identity developed in situ as a direct indigenous evolution of earlier Canaanite tribes; the continuity from Bronze Age Canaanite civilization to Iron Age Israelite/Judean civilization is indeed so seamless that many scholars stress that any dichotomy between the two is essentially arbitrary—with culture, language, etc., being indistinguishable during the transition from Bronze Age to Iron Age. The Phoenicians—also descended from the Bronze Age Canaanites, and close relatives and neighbors of the Israelites—likewise continued to speak a Canaanite language and practice Canaanite religion at their Mediterranean ports, and referred to themselves natively as "Canaanites", and their land as "Canaan".

Phoenicia 

  
  (Phoiníkē)
 Hebrew
 Israeli  (Finiqiyah)
 
 

In ancient times, the Greeks called the whole of Canaan Phoiníkē, literally "[land] of the purple[-producing shell]". Today, general consensus associates the Phoenician homeland proper with the northwest coastal region of the Levant, centered at Phoenician cities such as Ugarit, Tyre, Sidon, and Byblos. Today, this place is usually equated with modern Lebanon and the coast of modern Syria. Also, there is a modern town in Turkey called Finike which is thought to have derived by the Lycians who traded with Phoenicians in ancient times.

Israel and Judea 
Israel:
Egyptian: ysrỉꜣri-i-z:Z1s*Z1s:r-i-A-r:Z1*T14-A1*B1:Z2
  
 Canaanite: 𐤉𐤔𐤓𐤀𐤋 (j.s.r.ʔ.l)
 Ugaritic: 𐎊𐎌𐎗𐎛𐎍 (yšrʾil)
  (Israḗl)
 Hebrew
 Israeli  (Yisrael)
 Tiberian  
 Biblical Hebrew: 𐤉𐤔𐤓𐤀𐤋 
 
 
 Middle Persian: Adēr / Adēl
  (Esrajil)

Judea:
  
 Akkadian: 𒅀𒌑𒁕𒀀𒀀 (ia-u2-da-a-a)
  (Ioudaía)
 Hebrew
 Israeli  (Yehuda)
 Tiberian Hebrew: Yəhūḏā
  (Jæhudije / Jæhudija)
 
 

The kingdoms of Israel and Judah were Iron Age Semitic nations spanning from Edom to Assyria. Today, the modern State of Israel controls much of the former territory of the ancient Israelite/Judean kingdoms. According to the Deuteronomic history in the Bible, the polities of Israel and Judah originally split off from an earlier, united Kingdom of Israel, ruled by illustrious kings such as David and Solomon; though modern archaeology, biblical scholarship, and historians are generally somewhat skeptical of the historicity of the alleged united monarchy of Israel, suggesting instead that the two kingdoms developed separately, with the southern kingdom of Judah probably dependent on the northern kingdom of Israel as a satellite state at first.

The term Judaea is used by historians to refer to the Roman province that extended over parts of the former regions of the Hasmonean and Herodian kingdoms. It was named after Herod Archelaus's ethnarchy of Judea of which it was an expansion, the name being derived from the earlier provincial designations Yehud Medinata (Achaemenid) and Yehud (Neo-Babylonian): all ultimately referring to the former Hebrew kingdom of Judah.

Assyria and Syria 

During Persian rule of the Near East, the Greeks and Romans came to call the region "Syria", believed to have been named after Assyria and the Aramaic language they spread over the entire region. However, Herodotus used the combined name "Syria Palaistinē". "Greater Syria" refers to a larger area that is supported by some nationalists.

During the Syrian Wars between the Seleucid dynasty and the Ptolemaic dynasty (274-168 BC), the region was known as Coele-Syria traditionally given the meaning 'hollow' Syria. The later Hellenistic term Koile Syria that appears first in Arrian's Anabasis Alexandri (2.13.7) in AD 145 and has been much discussed, is usually interpreted as a transcription of Aramaic kul, "all, the entire", identifying all of Syria.

Palestine 

Palestine:
  
 Hebrew
 Israeli  (Palestina), or Israeli  (Falastin)
  (Felestin)
  - same word as Philistia
 

An early version of the name Palestine was first recorded by the ancient Egyptians as Peleset. Herodotus later called the whole area Syria Palaistinē in his Histories (c. 450 BC), and included the entire territory of ancient Israel and Judea (which he noted for the practice of circumcision), not specifically the coastal Philistine territory (whose people notably did not practice circumcision). The Romans applied the term Syria Palaestina to the southern part of the region—beginning in AD 135, following the Bar Kokhba revolt—to complete the disassociation with the former identity of Judaea. The name continued to be used for the province throughout later Byzantine and Islamic rule.

†As a side note, Standard Hebrew has two names for Palestine, both of which are different from the Hebrew name for ancient Philistia. The first name Palestina was used by Hebrew speakers in the British Mandate of Palestine; it is spelled like the name for Philistia but with three more letters added to the end and a Latin pronunciation given. The second name Falastin is a direct loan from the Arabic form, and is used today specifically to refer to the modern Palestinians and to political aspirations for a Palestinian state.

Philistia 

Philistia:
 Canaanite: 𐤐𐤋𐤔𐤕 (p.l.ʃ.t)
 Hebrew
 Israeli  (Pleshet)
 Tiberian  
  - from Greek

Eber-Nari and Transeuphratia 
Eber-Nari was the name of a satrapy of the Achaemenid Empire which roughly corresponded with the southern Levant. It means "Beyond the River" or "Across the River" in both Akkadian and Aramaic (that is, the western side of the Euphrates from a Mesopotamian and Persian viewpoint). It is also sometimes referred to as Transeuphratia (French Transeuphratène) by modern scholars.

Medieval and modern history

Shaam 
The Arabic name for the region of Levant is Shaam comes from the Arabic root meaning "left" or "north". After the Islamic conquest of the region, Shaam became the name of the Levant (Byzantine Syria).

In ancient times, Baalshamin or Ba'al Šamem, was a Semitic sky-god in Canaan/Phoenicia and ancient Palmyra. However, the syllable "sham" in Baalshamin has nothing to do with the name shaam but is just by chance the middle syllable of the word for "sky", comparable to Hebrew שָׁמַיִם (shamayim).

Levant 
Medieval Italians called the region Levante after its easterly location where the sun "rises"; this term was adopted from Italian and French into many other languages.

Outremer 
Frankish Crusaders called the Levant Outremer in French, which means "overseas." In France, this general term was colloquially applied more specifically to the Levant because of heavy Frankish involvement in the Crusades and the foundation of the Latin Kingdom of Jerusalem and other Latin settlements scattered throughout the area.

Eastern Mediterranean 
Eastern Mediterranean is a term that denotes the lands or states geographically in the eastern, to the east of, or around the east of the Mediterranean Sea, or with cultural affinities to this region. The Eastern Mediterranean includes Cyprus, Syria, Lebanon, Palestine, Israel, and Jordan. The term Mediterranean derives from the Latin word mediterraneus, meaning "in the middle of earth" or "between lands" (medius, "middle, between" + terra, "land, earth"). This is on account of the sea's intermediary position between the continents of Africa and Europe.

Holy Land 

In different languages:
  (Al-Arḍ al-Muqaddasah in the Islamic holy book, the Quran)
  (Hagioi Topoi, modern ), literally: "Holy Places")
  (Erets ha-Kodesh)
 
 

The Holy Land is a term used in Abrahamic tradition to refer to sacred sites of the Levant — such as Shiloh, Jerusalem, Bethlehem and Nazareth — but is also often used to refer to the Levant (and historical Canaan) as a whole.

See also 
 Names of Jerusalem
 Near East

References

External links 
 

Ancient Levant
Ancient Near East
History of the Levant
Levant
Levant